Ginny Weds Sunny is a 2020 Indian Hindi romantic comedy film starring Yami Gautam as Ginny and Vikrant Massey as Sunny. It is directed by debutant Puneet Khanna and produced by Vinod Bachchan.

Following its announcement on 11 July 2019, principal photography of the film began on 20 September; it was shot in Delhi, Noida, Ghaziabad and Manali. The filming was wrapped up in November 2019. Due to the COVID-19 pandemic, the film was released on 9 October 2020 on Netflix.

Plot
The film follows outgoing Ginny  who meets Sunny for an arranged marriage but rejects him, then shows how Sunny teams up with Ginny's mother to win her love.

Cast
Yami Gautam as Simran 'Ginny' Juneja
Vikrant Massey as Satnam Sethi (Sunny)
Ayesha Raza Mishra as Shobha Juneja
Suhail Nayyar as Nishant Rathee
Rajiv Gupta as Pappi Sethi
Mazel Vyas as Nimmi Sethi
Maneka Kurup Arora as Rita Sethi
Gurpreet Saini as Sumit
Sanchita Puri as Prerna
Mansi Sharma as Manpreet
Karan Singh Chhabra as Timmy
Isha Talwar as Neha Gulati
Venus Singh as Sanya Malhotra
Deepak Chadha as Gulshan Gulati
Munish Dev Mohan as Ramesh Gulati
Mayank Chaudhary as Bittoo
Aniket Kumar as Abhijit Singh
Mika Singh as a special appearance in the song "Sawan Mein Lag Gayi Aag"
Neha Kakkar as a special appearance in the song "Sawan Mein Lag Gayi Aag"
Badshah as a special appearance in the song "Sawan Mein Lag Gayi Aag"

Production
The movie was announced on 11 July 2019 with a cast including Yami Gautam and Vikrant Massey. It was directed by Puneet Khanna and produced by Vinod Bachchan under Soundrya Production. Navjot Gulati wrote the story and Sumit Arora wrote the dialogues. It marks Khanna's directorial debut. Sony Music India was roped in as the official music partner.

Filming started on 20 September 2019 in Delhi, then the film was shot in Noida, Ghaziabad and Manali. In Ghaziabad, the movie was shot in Raj Nagar Sector 5 and in Sector 4 Central Park along with several other places as small references. Shooting ended in November 2019.

Release
Due to the COVID-19 pandemic, the film was released on 9 October 2020 on Netflix.

Soundtrack

The soundtrack was composed by Payal Dev, Gaurav Chatterji and Jaan Nissar Lone while the lyrics were written by Kunaal Vermaa, Mohsin Shaikh, Payal Dev, Badshah, Sandeep Gaur, and Peer Zahoor.

The song "Sawan Mein Lag Gayi Aag" is from an original track of the same title from the album Saawan Mein Lag Gayee Aag by Mika Singh, composed and written by Mika Singh. This is the second time the song is being recreated after 2008's film Woodstock Villa which was sung by Mika Singh. Later the song was recreated again by Mika Singh for the 2020s film Indoo Ki Jawani, as "Hasina Pagal Deewani", sung by Mika Singh and Asees Kaur.

References

External links

Ginny Weds Sunny on Bollywood Hungama

2020 romantic comedy films
Films shot in India
Films shot in Delhi
2020s Hindi-language films
Indian romantic comedy films
Films about Indian weddings
Films scored by Payal Dev
Films scored by Gaurav Chatterji
Films scored by Jubin Nautiyal
Films shot in Uttar Pradesh
Films shot in Himachal Pradesh
Hindi-language Netflix original films
Indian direct-to-video films